Hartwigia is a genus of thrips in the family Phlaeothripidae.

Species
 Hartwigia tumiceps

References

Phlaeothripidae
Thrips
Thrips genera
Monotypic insect genera